Federal Route 95, or Jalan Kukup, is a federal road in Johor, Malaysia, connecting Pontian Kechil to the fishing town of Kukup. It is also a main route to Tanjung Piai.

Route background
The Kilometre Zero of the Federal Route 95 starts at Kukup.

Features

At most sections, the Federal Route 95 was built under the JKR R5 road standard, allowing maximum speed limit of up to 90 km/h.

List of junctions and towns

References

095
Pontian District
Roads in Johor